Constituency W-301 is a reserved Constituency for female in the Provincial Assembly of Punjab.

General elections 2008

General elections 2013

General elections 2018

See also 

 Punjab, Pakistan

External links 
 Election commission Pakistan's official website
 Awazoday.com 
 Official Website of Government of Punjab

References 

Provincial constituencies of Punjab, Pakistan